Gennady (also Gennadii) Ivanovich Pasko (born 26 October 1940, Sukhumi) is a Russian impressionist painter.

Education
Pasko finished Batumi art school in 1959.

He graduated from the faculty of applied art (decorative arts) of the Moscow Textile Institute in 1965.

Recognition
Pasko is the people's artist of Russia for 1995.

He was awarded a Diploma of the Russian Academy of Arts in 2001.

References

20th-century Russian painters
Russian male painters
21st-century Russian painters
Russian Impressionist painters
1940 births
Living people
People from Sukhumi
People's Artists of Russia
Soviet Impressionist painters
20th-century Russian male artists
21st-century Russian male artists